Kamis is the surname of the following notable people:
Adam Kamis (born 1979), Singaporean para-athlete and motivational speaker
Auni Fathiah Kamis (born 1991), Malaysian international lawn bowler
Bengt Kamis (born 1943), Swedish sports shooter
Fadli Kamis (born 1992), Singapore football defender
Raudhah Kamis (born 1999), Singaporean football forward 
Rosmin Kamis (born 1981), Bruneian football player